Rustic Houses, Forlorn Valleys is the fourth full-length records for the Leeds-based band Hood.  The LP and CD versions were both released on Domino Records in 1998.

Track listing

References

External links 
Hood Homepage
Domino Records

1998 albums
Hood (band) albums